Stormberg may refer to:

 Stormberg Mountains, Eastern Cape province, South Africa
 Stormberg District, Eastern Cape province of South Africa
 Stormberg Group, sedimentary geological formations in Karoo Basin, Southern Africa
 Battle of Stormberg, 1899 battle of the Second Boer War
 Stormberg AS, Norwegian sports clothes retail company

See also
 Stormbergia, a genus of early ornithischian dinosaur